Catoptria zermattensis is a species of moth in the family Crambidae. It is found in France, Switzerland and Italy.

References

Crambini
Moths of Europe
Moths described in 1870